Ponkathir is a 1953 Indian Malayalam-language film, directed by E. R. Cooper and produced by P. Subramaniam. The film stars Prem Nazir and Thikkurissy Sukumaran Nair. The film was dubbed into Tamil with the title Irulukku Pin and released in 1954.

Plot 
Ravi is the son of a rich industrialist Prabhu. Madhu is the Factory Manager.  Business flourishes under this loyal manager. Vikraman is Prabhu's nephew who tries to manipulate the assets of Prabhu. Ravi loves Radha, daughter of a poor farmer who is also a friend of Prabhu. Vikraman also loves Radha. The story is woven around these people. After many twists and turns, all ends well.

Cast 

Male cast
 Prem Nazir as Ravi
 S. P. Pillai as Pappan
 Thikkurissy Sukumaran Nair as Vikraman
 T. S. Muthaiah as Shanku
 C. I. Parameswaran Pillai
 K. P. Kottarakkara
 SR Pallatt
 Muthukulam Raghavan Pillai as Mathupilla
 Soman

Female cast
 Lalitha as Radha
 C. S. Radhadevi
 * T. R. Omana
 Adoor Pankajam
 Kumari Thankam
 K. V. Shanthi
 Aranmula Ponnamma
 Pankajavalli
 Ragini
 Bharathi

Production 
The film was produced under the banner Neela Productions and was directed by E. R. Cooper. The story and dialogues were written by K. P. Kottarakkara. Cinematography was handled by V. Ramamoorthy and the sound recording was done by Krishna Elamon. This is the film debut for Playback singer Kamukara Purushothaman and stage actor C. I. Parameswaran Pillai.

Soundtrack 
Music was composed by Br Lakshmanan and the lyrics were penned by Thirunainar Kurichi Madhavan Nair. Playback singers are Kaviyoor Revamma, Ganabhooshanam N. Lalitha, Jikki, Mehboob and Kamukara Purushothaman.

Anjana Sreedharaa Chaarumoorthey Krishnaa..., a song sung by N. Lalitha in traditional style, became popular and is considered one of the best devotional film songs in Malayalam.

References

External links 
 

1950s Malayalam-language films
1953 drama films
Indian drama films
Films scored by Br Lakshmanan